The Aranthalawa massacre was the massacre of 33 Buddhist monks, most of them young novice monks, and four civilians by cadres of the Liberation Tigers of Tamil Eelam organization (the LTTE, commonly known as the Tamil Tigers) on June 2, 1987, close to the village of Aranthalawa, in the Ampara District of Eastern Sri Lanka. The massacre is among the most notorious and devastating atrocities committed by the LTTE during the history of the Sri Lankan Civil War, and continues to be commemorated 35 years on.

The massacre
The Aranthalawa Massacre took place on June 2, 1987, when a bus carrying Buddhist monks, most of whom were child monks, and a few unarmed civilians was ambushed by 20 armed LTTE cadres near the village of Nuwaragalatenna, led by an LTTE leader named Reagan. They then ordered the driver of the bus, which was carrying the monks on a pilgrimage from their temple in Mahavapi to the Kelaniya Raja Maha Vihara, to drive into the nearby Aranthalawa jungle. After the bus stopped, the LTTE cadres went on a rampage, attacking the monks with  guns and swords and also shooting some of them with machine guns.

Among the dead were 30 young novice monks between the ages of 7 and 18 and their mentor, the Chief Priest of the Vidyananda Maha Pirivena, Hegoda Sri Indrasara Thera. Four civilians who were traveling in the bus were also among the dead.

Three monks who escaped the massacre sustaining critical injuries continue to require medical assistance. Another monk was permanently disabled.

Motives
The Divaina newspaper viewed the attack as a LTTE attempt to increase animosity between the two races and cause a Sinhalese backlash against Tamil civilians, which would increase support and funding towards their violent campaign.

Reactions
Theravada monks are incapable of defending themselves. The harming of monk is considered to be one of the highest offenses in Theravada Buddhism or even among Hindu. The massacre is considered to be one of the most brutal attacks carried out during the conflict in Sri Lanka.

Each year Aranthalawa Massacre is commemorated by a series of special programs. In 2007, to coincide with the 20th anniversary of the massacre, commemorations were held over the course of four days in Colombo and Ampara, with the main ceremony led by Sri Lanka President Mahinda Rajapaksa taking place in Colombo with the participation of the Mahanayake Theras of all Chapters. An all night Pirith ceremony was held on the same night, and a Sanghika Dāna was offered to 200 Buddhist monks on June 3. An exhibition of over 300 photographs of LTTE attacks on Buddhist sites and other acts of destruction was also organized.

A plaque has since been constructed close to the site of the incident to commemorate the massacre.

Retaliation
In retaliation the Special Task Force unit of the Sri Lankan security forces ordered Reagan's family members to stand before them in their Vellaveli homes, and after reading their names from a list, shot them to death and dismembered their bodies.

Similar attacks
Throughout  the course of the conflict in Sri Lanka, the LTTE has carried out a number of similar attacks against Buddhist sites. These includes :

an attack on the Jaya Sri Maha Bodhi, killing around 146 pilgrims.
the assassination of the high priest of the famous Dimbulagala Forest monastery, Kithalagama Seelalankara Nayaka Thera, who gave moral support to people living in border villages to fight LTTE intrusions into their villages, eight years after the Aranthalawa Massacre.
a suicide bombing of the Temple of the Tooth, the sacred Buddhist shrine where the Buddha’s tooth relic is enshrined, which killed 17 worshipers and seriously damaged the temple.
a suicide bombing of a Buddhist temple in Batticaloa during celebrations of the Vesak holiday, killing 23 people including many children.

References

External links
LTTE massacre site is haven for Tamil victims, BBC News
20 Years for the Aranthalawa Massacre
Editorial - LTTE's gun culture continues, Sunday Observer
Monument of Aranthalawa Massacre

1987 crimes in Sri Lanka
Massacres in 1987
June 1987 events in Asia
June 1987 crimes
Attacks on civilians attributed to the Liberation Tigers of Tamil Eelam
Massacres in Sri Lanka
Liberation Tigers of Tamil Eelam attacks in Eelam War I
Mass murder of Sinhalese
Terrorist incidents in Sri Lanka in 1987
Persecution of Buddhists